Shane Benis is an entrepreneur in Shanghai, China. He is the founder/CEO of China Sports Promotions and producer of White Collar Boxing International,  a leading event management company promoting white-collar boxing in the Asian Pacific. While born in London, Shane spent most of his childhood in Kampala, Uganda which is where his father originates from.

Career
2008

Benis organised the first white collar boxing event in Shanghai China with 320 attendees. Several entrepreneurs based in Shanghai assisted in the events delivery including the Australian entrepreneur Andrew Collins from Mailman group.

2011

Created Golden Gloves Boxing gym, the only dedicated boxing gym in Shanghai. The gym has trained over 5,000 people.

2012

Created China Sports Promotions whose mandate was to facilitate boxing participation and understanding in China. Up until this point boxing events were still a hobby.

2012

The first white collar boxing event was organised in Beijing. Named Brawl On The Wall, the event saw 400 people in attendance.

2014

Organised the first white collar boxing event in Macao at The Venetian Macao for 720 guests. The event was attended by boxing personalities such as announcer Michael Buffer and Boxing Hall of Fame Coach Freddy Roach.

2015

Shane took the next major step to develop the sport of boxing in China by partnering with online television platform Sohu.com to create the reality television show 'White Collar Boxing'. Only available to watch in China, the show aired over 8 weeks featuring local and expatriate business men and women living in Shanghai. The show received a modest 8 million views.

Charity
Shane has been an avid supporter of charitable events since attending university in London. His events have helped support Leo's Foundation and the Neonatal Intensive Care Unit at Fudan University Children's Hospital.

References

Boxing promoters
Chinese businesspeople
Living people
Year of birth missing (living people)